Cangoderces is a genus of African long-legged cave spiders that was first described by Harington in 1951.

Species
 it contains six species, found in Africa:
Cangoderces cameroonensis Baert, 1985 – Cameroon
Cangoderces christae Wang & Li, 2011 – Ivory Coast
Cangoderces globosa Wang, Li & Haddad, 2018 – South Africa
Cangoderces koupeensis Baert, 1985 – Cameroon
Cangoderces lewisi Harington, 1951 (type) – South Africa
Cangoderces milani Wang & Li, 2011 – Cameroon

See also
 List of Telemidae species

References

Araneomorphae genera
Spiders of Africa
Telemidae